Cecilie Mørch Hansen (born 8 December 1993) is a Danish handball player who currently plays for Aarhus United in the Danish Women's Handball League.

References

1993 births
Living people
People from Randers
Danish female handball players
Sportspeople from the Central Denmark Region
21st-century Danish women